Nawada district is one of the thirty-eight districts of the Indian state of Bihar. Nawada is its administrative headquarters. The district is the easternmost district of the Magadh division, one of the nine administrative divisions of Bihar. The area of the modern district was historically part of the Magadha, Shunga and Gupta empires. Koderma and Giridih districts of the state of Jharkhand lie on the southern border of the district; it also shares borders with the Gaya, Nalanda, Sheikhpura, and Jamui districts of Bihar.

History

In 1845, Nawada was made a subdivision of Gaya district. Nawada district was separated from Gaya district on January 26, 1973.

Kakolat Falls are mentioned in Hindu Pauranik History as the abode of a king turned into a python by a Rishi's curse.

Geography
Most parts of the district are plain but some areas are hilly. The main rivers are the Sakri, Khuri, Panchane, Bhusri by Kakolat and Tilaiya.

Administrative divisions
Nawada District is divided into two Sub-divisions and then into 14 blocks. These blocks in their respective sub-divisions are as follows :

Nawada sub-division
 Hisua – Bagodar, Chhatihar, Chitarghati, Dhanwa, Dona, Eknar, Hadsa, Hisua Nagar Panchayat, Kaithir, Pachra, Sonsa, Tekpur, Tungi
 Warisaliganj – Makanpur, Apsarh, Baghi Bardiha, Pakribarawan, Chakwae, Dosut, Hajipur, Kochgawn, Kumbhi, Kutri, Manjaur, Masudha, Mohiuddin Pur, Mosima, Naromurar, Paingari, Gorapar, Saur, Shahpur, Thera, Warisaliganj Nagar Panchayat, maafi, simri, may, chainpur, chandipur, balyari, baali, bilaari.
 Nawada – Bhadauni, Akauna Minhai, Amthi, Bhadokhra, Bhagwanpur, Didaur, Gonawa, Jamuawa Patwa Sarai, Jhunathi, Kharant, Loharpura, Mahuli, Nanaura, Nawada Nagar Parishad, Oraina, Paura, Quadirganj, Samai, Sonsiahri
 Kawakol – Chhabail, Darawa, Debnagar, Kawakol, Kebali, Khadshari, Lalpur, Mahudar, Manjhila, Nawadaih, Paharpur, Pali, Pandegangot, Saroni, Shekhodewra
 Nardiganj – Dohra, Handiya, Ichua Karna, Kahuara, Kosla, Masaurha, Nardiganj, Nanaura, Odo, Parma, Pesh
 Kashichak – Parwati, Revera, Jagdishpur, Chandinama, Khakhari, Belar, Birnawa, Subhanpur, Derhgaon, Sarkatti
Pakari Barawan – Belkhunda, Budhaul, Dioura, Okaura, Dewdha, Dhodha, Dumrawan, Dumari, Lilo, Sundari, Euri, Jiuri, Kewala, Kunanpur, Pakri Barawan, Poksi

Rajauli sub-division
 Akbarpur – Baksanda, Baliya Buzurg, Barail, Barew, Bhanail, Bhudhuwa, Fattehpur, Gobind Bigha, Kulna, Ladaha, Malikpur, Nemdarganj, Mankhar, Pachgawan, Pachrukhi, Paijuna, Panti, Parto Karahri, Pharaha, Sakarpura, Diri
 Narhat – Babhnaur, Jamuara, Khanwa, Konibar, Narhat, Pali Kurd, Punaul, Punthar, Saidapur Goasa, Shekhpura
 Meskaur – Akri Pandebigha, Barat, Barosar, Biju Bigha, Meskaur, Mairzapur, Pasarhi, Rasulpur, Saraye, Tetariya, Mahugay
 Sirdala – Abdul, Akauna, Bandhi, Bargawan, Chaube, Chaukia, Dhiraundh, Ghaghat, Khalkhu, Khanpura, Khatangi, Laund, Rajan, Sanrh Majhgawn, Sirdala, Upardih
 Rajauli – Amawa East, Amawa West, Andharbari, Bahadurpur, Chitarkoli, Dhamni, Hardiya, Jogya Maran, Lengura, Murhena, Parka Buzurg, Rajauli Nagar Panchayat, Sawaiya Tand, Sirodabar, Takua Tand
 
 Govindpur – Baksoti, Baniya Bigha, Budhwara, Madhopur, Bisunpur, Bhawanpur, Delhua, Sarkanda, Sughri, Govindpur
 Roh – Nazardih, Ohari, Marui
Nawada also has 5 Assembly constituencies: Nawada, Hisua, Rajauli, Gobindpur and Warisaliganj.

Economy
The main crops harvested in the district are paddy, wheat, pulses, and vegetables. Industrial facilities in the district include bidi factories and silk handlooms. Formerly, sugar cane farming and processing also took place; the district's single sugar mill, located in Warisaliganj, is currently non-functional. Kadirganj, located 10 km from Nawada, has a silk small scale industry where workers clean and weave silk.

Rajauli Hisua and Warsaliganj are emerging as significant market hubs for the hinterland regions bordering Jharkhand state, and have also produced many professionals including physicians, surgeons, engineers who are working in many parts of India. The Nuclear Power Corporation of India identified Rajauli as the possible site for creating an additional 2,800 MW of nuclear power capacity in the state.

In 2006 the Ministry of Panchayati Raj named Nawada one of the country's 250 most backward districts (out of a total of 640). It is one of the 38 districts in Bihar currently receiving funds from the Backward Regions Grant Fund Programme (BRGF).

Transport
National Highway 20 runs roughly north–south through the western side of district, serving many villages and towns, including the administrative center of Nawada. National Highway 120 follows a 30 km route in the far northwestern corner of the district, passing through the town of Hisua. Including state highways and other routes connecting villages, the district has approximately 420 km of paved roads. Deluxe buses are available from Nawada to cities like Patna, Bihar Shariff, Bodh Gaya, Rajgir, Koderma and major cities Patna, Kolkata, Ranchi, Bokaro,Jamshedpur etc.

The district lies in the East Central Railway of Indian Railways; the Gaya–Kiul line crosses the district roughly east–west, and connects with the Bakhtiyarpur–Tilaiya line at Tilaiya Junction. Two express trains and several local trains run on the Gaya-Kiul line via Nawada railway station. Though electrification is complete, doubling of railway line is under process . This would provide alternative route for Kolkata and North-East bound trains and would enhance passenger services and freight trains. Currently a Delhi bound train is already scheduled and running from Godda to New Delhi and vice versa has halt at Nawada railway station.

Demographics

According to the 2011 census Nawada district has a population of 2,219,146, roughly equal to the nation of Latvia or the US state of New Mexico. This gives it a ranking of 205th in India (out of a total of 640). Its population growth rate over the decade 2001-2011 was 22.49%. Nawada had a sex ratio of 936 females for every 1000 males, and a literacy rate of 61.63%. 9.71% of the population lives in urban areas. Scheduled Castes and Scheduled Tribes make up 25.47% and 0.09% of the population respectively.

At the time of the 2011 Census of India, 55.52% of the population in the district spoke Magahi, 36.64% Hindi and 7.57% Urdu as their first language.

Politics 
  

|}

Education
The district has good literacy percentage.
There are numerous institution for Higher education and secondary education.

Higher educational institutes
 KLs College, Nawada
 TS College, Hisua
 Krishna Memorial College, Nawada
 Krishak college dheodha .
 S N Sinha college, Warisaliganj
 SGBK Sahu senior secondary school Warisaliganj
 Mahila college warisaliganj
 National school mafi warisaliganj
 Warsi College Pandeygangout Kawakol, Nawada
 RMW College, Nawada
 Seth Sagarmal College 
 Sita Ram Sahu College, Nawada
 Ram lakhan Singh Yadav College, Nawada
 Triveni College of Education, Nawada
 Swami Sahjanand Saraswati Sanskrit College, Nawada
 Ganauri Ramkali Teacher's Training College, Nawada
 Nawada Vidhi Mahavidyalaya
 Ravikant Punam B.Ed college Dosut Warsaliganj, Nawada

Secondary educational institutes
RPS Convent Public School, Nawada
Dayal Public School, Nawada
Jawahar Navodaya Vidyalaya, Rewar, Nawada
Gyan Bharti Model Residential Complex, Hisua
Modern English School, Nawada
Manas Bharti Educational Complex, Nawada
Jeevan Jyoti Public School, Nawada
Gyan Bharti Public School, Nawada
Jeevan Deep Public School, Nawada
Gyan Bharti Public School, Pakribarawan, Nawada
St. Joseph's School, Nawada
The Diksha School, Nawada
Delhi Public School, Nawada
Momin High School, par Nawada
Gandhi Inter School, Nawada
Bless International School (CBSE 10+2 Arts, Science & Commerce) ,Nawada
Iraqui Urdu Girls School (10+2) , Ansar Nagar, Nawada 
Unique Public School,Nawada
Ideal Public School & Ideal Paramedical College , Takiya Park,  Nawada

See also 

 Gaya
 Patna
 Begusarai
 Lakhisarai

Tourism
Nawada district has its own tourism splendour and has the potential to develop as a tourist destination. In the town's immediate surroundings, there are various points of interest. The Kakolat Waterfall (24 km from town) and the Sekho Devra Ashram are among them (Sarvodaya Ashram was established here in Kowakole block by Jaiprakash Narayan and inaugurated by Dr. Rajendra Prasad), Baba Majaar and Hanuman Temple (located on NH 31, a shrine of Hazrat Saiyyad Shah Jalaluddin Bukhari and a Hanuman temple), Jarra Baba (found in Sirdalla), Hanuman Mandir (located in Kendua village), and Maa Bageshwari Mandir (located in Kendua village) (located in Jamuawa, in 3 km of Jamui road of Nawada in side of Sakri River).

References

External links
 Official website

 
Magadh division
Districts of Bihar